Archibald Campbell, 3rd Duke of Argyll, 1st Earl of Ilay,  (June 1682 – 15 April 1761) was a Scottish nobleman, politician, lawyer, businessman, and soldier. He was known as Lord Archibald Campbell from 1703 to 1706, and as the Earl of Ilay from 1706 until 1743, when he succeeded to the dukedom.  He was the dominant political leader in Scotland in his day, and was involved in many civic projects.

Early life and career
Born at Ham House, Petersham, Surrey, he was the second son of Archibald Campbell, 10th Earl and 1st Duke of Argyll (1658–1703) and his wife Elizabeth, eldest daughter of Sir Lionel Tollemache, 3rd Baronet of Helmingham, Suffolk. He was the first cousin once removed of Lord William Campbell.

He was educated at Eton College and later at the University of Glasgow and then Utrecht University, where he studied civil law. On his father being created a duke in 1703 he joined the army, and served for a short time under the duke of Marlborough. He was appointed Lord High Treasurer of Scotland by Queen Anne in 1705.

He supported his brother, John Campbell, 2nd Duke of Argyll (on many topics, most notably the Act of Union), earning him the title of Earl of Ilay in 1706. Following the treaty of union he was elected as one of the sixteen Scottish peers to sit in the House of Lords.

His military career, which was less successful than his brother's, was somewhat distinguished. He obtained the Colonelcy of the newly formed 36th Regiment of Foot in 1709 (until 1710) and assisted his brother at the 1715 Battle of Sheriffmuir.

Political power

In 1711 he was appointed to the Privy Council. Many called him the "most powerful man in Scotland", at least until the era of Henry Dundas.  Prime Minister Robert Walpole gave Campbell control over the royal patronage in Scotland. That became his base of power; he used it to control the votes of the other Scottish peers in the election of 16 representative peers to the British Parliament in London. He was appointed Keeper of the Privy Seal of Scotland in 1721, and was afterwards entrusted with the principal management of Scottish affairs. In 1733 he was made Keeper of the Great Seal of Scotland, an office which he held until his death.
 
Lord Ilay played a critical role in establishing The Faculty of Medicine at the University of Edinburgh in 1726.

He was one of the founders of the Royal Bank of Scotland in 1727, and acted as the bank's first governor. His portrait has appeared on the front of all Royal Bank of Scotland banknotes, and as a watermark on the notes, since they were redesigned in 1987. The portrait is based on a painting by Allan Ramsay, in the Scottish National Portrait Gallery.

He was also one of the founders of the British Linen Company, founded in 1746. He acted as the company's first Governor until his death in 1761 and held an instrumental role in the promotion of the Linen manufacture in Scotland.

Duke of Argyll
He succeeded his brother to the title of Duke of Argyll in October 1743. He worked on Inveraray Castle, his brother's estate, which was finished in the 1750s; however, he never lived in it, and he died in 1761. He is buried at Kilmun Parish Church.

He was married to Anne Whitfield about 1712, but had no legitimate male issue at his death.  In his will, he left his English property to his mistress Ann (née Shireburn) Williams.  His titles passed to his cousin, John Campbell, 4th Duke of Argyll, the son of his father's brother John Campbell of Mamore.

The Duke established an estate at Whitton Park, Whitton in Middlesex in 1722 on land that had been enclosed some years earlier from Hounslow Heath. The Duke was an enthusiastic gardener and he imported large numbers of exotic species of plants and trees for his estate. He was nicknamed the "Treemonger" by Horace Walpole. On his death, many of these, including mature trees, were moved by his nephew, John Stuart, 3rd Earl of Bute, to the Princess of Wales' new garden at Kew. This later became Kew Gardens and some of the Duke's trees are still to be seen there to this day. The Duke of Argyll's Tea Tree is an imported shrub named after him which has become established in hedgerows in some parts of England.

In Fiction

Literature 
In Neil Munro's novel Doom Castle (1901), Archibald Campbell features as the 3rd Duke of Argyll, and in The New Road (1914) as the Earl of Ilay.

Television 
In The Black Adder, the first series of historical sitcom Blackadder, the second episode, Born to Be King, the Third Duke of Argyll is mentioned, however this Duke is not Archibald Campbell, with the episode being set in 1487, 195 years before Campbell was born. The Fourth Duke of Argyll is shown on screen, and rather than being John Campbell, 3rd Duke's cousin, he is the son of the 3rd Duke, and is called Dougal MacAngus, and is played by Alex Norton.

See also
 People on Scottish banknotes

Notes

References
 Emerson, Roger. An Enlightened Duke: The Life of Archibald Campbell (1682–1761), Earl of Ilay, 3rd Duke of Argyll, Perspectives: Scottish Studies of The Long Eighteenth Century Series. Kilkerran: Humming Earth, 2013.  (paper);  (hbk).
 
 Matsuzono, Shin. "'Attaque and Break Through a Phalanx of Corruption . . . the Court Party!' The Scottish Representative Peers' Election and the Opposition, 1733-5: Three New Division Lists of the House of Lords of 1735," Parliamentary History (2012) 31#3 pp 332–353. 
 Munro, Neil. The history of The Royal Bank of Scotland, 1727–1927 (Edinburgh, 1928)
Shaw, John Stuart. The Management of Scottish Society 1707–1764: Power, Nobles, Lawyers, Edinburgh Agents and English Influences (Edinburgh, 1983)
 Sunter, Ronald. Patronage and Politics in Scotland, 1707–1832 (Edinburgh, 1986).

External links

Royal Bank of Scotland banknotes. Retrieved 30 August 2006.

1682 births
1761 deaths
People educated at Eton College
People associated with the University of Edinburgh
3
Keepers of the Great Seal of Scotland
Lord-Lieutenants of Midlothian
People from Richmond, London
Scottish representative peers
36th Regiment of Foot officers
People of the Jacobite rising of 1715
Lords Justice-General
Members of the Parliament of Scotland 1702–1707
18th-century Scottish landowners
Extraordinary Lords of Session
Burials at the Argyll Mausoleum
Peers of Scotland created by Queen Anne